The Corumbiara State Park is a state park in the state of Rondônia, Brazil.

Location

The Corumbiara State Park is divided between the municipalities of Pimenteiras do Oeste (51.78%), Alto Alegre dos Parecis (19.82%) and Cerejeiras (28.4%) in the state of Rondônia.
It is in the south of the state along the border with Bolivia, which is defined by the Guaporé River. 
The Mequéns River defines the northwest boundary.
The Rio Mequéns Indigenous Territory adjoins the park to the north.
The park has three support stations on the  Guaporé river and another in the town of Pimenteiras do Oeste.
The reserve would be included in the proposed Western Amazon Ecological Corridor.

Environment

70% of the park is subject to periodic flooding.
It is in an area of transition between the Amazon rainforest, pantanal and cerrado.
There is a range of vegetation types including alluvial forest with emergent canopy, pioneer alluvial formations, savanna parkland, open and dense savanna and open lowland rainforest.
About 50% is cerrado, with 28% forest and 22% aquatic.
Although no comprehensive survey has been made of the fauna, during preparation of the management plan 57 species of mammals were identified, 173 of birds and 20 of reptiles. 
There is some evidence of uncontacted Indians in the park.
As of 1999 the park was constantly threatened by fires and illegal hunting.

History

It was to be administered by the Rondônia State Forestry Institute, an agency linked to the Secretariat of State for the Environment (SEMARO).

Federal act 91 of 30 June 2004 gave preliminary approval to assign  of federal union land for use by the state of Rondônia in creating the park.
The state was to avoid isolating the area containing the town of Laranjeiras.
The consultative council was created by decree 14926 of 25 February 2010.
A revised management plan was approved on 17 September 2010.
On 2 July 2012 SEMARO entered a mutual cooperation agreement for managing the park with the Centro de Estudos da Cultura e do Meio Ambiente da Amazônia (RIOTERRA).
As of 2016 the park was supported by the Amazon Region Protected Areas Program.

Notes

Sources

State parks of Brazil
Protected areas of Rondônia
1990 establishments in Brazil